Gratiot is a surname. Notable people with the surname include:

Charles Gratiot, Sr. (1752–1817), French-American fur trapper
Charles Gratiot (1786–1855), American military engineer, son of Charles Sr.
Henry Gratiot (1789–1836), French-American pioneer, farmer, and mill owner, son of Charles Sr.